Dhaukalpur Malasa is a village in Kanpur Dehat district, Uttar Pradesh, India.

Malasa is one of the two development block in Bhognipur tehsil.

Demographics
As of 2011 India census Malasa	had a population of 3605 Males constitute 52.46% of the population and females 47.54%

External links
Malasa

References

Villages in Kanpur Dehat district